Ornativalva grisea is a moth of the family Gelechiidae. It was described by Sattler in 1967. It is found in Afghanistan and China (Xinjiang).

The wingspan is 16–17 mm. Adults have been recorded on wing from May to July.

References

Moths described in 1967
Ornativalva